The Mixed relay event of the Biathlon World Championships 2013 was held on February 7, 2013. 27 nations participated with two male and female biathletes. The women's course was 6 km and the men's 7.5 km.

Results
The race started at 17:30.

References

Mixed relay
Mixed sports competitions